Claudiu Bleonț (born 17 August 1959) is a Romanian film and theatre actor, comedian, television celebrity, and television presenter at TVR1, for the show Duminica în familie.  He is known in Romania not only for acting, but also for his improvisation.

Life and career
Since then, he has played lead roles at many theatres in Romania, often preferring more classical productions. However, one of his most well-known theatre performances is as Romeo in a production of Shakespeare's Romeo and Juliet with the balcony scene replaced with a bathtub. He has received several national awards for his theatre work.

He has since appeared in seventeen films, under many of the Romanian directors. He had a lead role in the film Un été inoubliable under the direction of Lucian Pintilie; the film was nominated for the Golden Palm at the 1994 Cannes Film Festival.

He married Beatrice Bleonț, a stage director, in 1995; they have since divorced and since 2001 he has been married to Andra Negulescu, an actress. 

In the 2003 film Boudica, Bleonț played the role of Suetonius' ADC. In 2005 he acted in Femeia visurilor, a Romanian film directed by Dan Pița. He appeared in Eva, which premiered at the Cannes Film Festival in 2010.

Filmography
  (1981)
  (1984)
  (1984)
 Pas în doi (1985)
 Flames over Treasures (1988)
 Rochia albă de dantelă (1988)
 Autor Anonim (1989)
 An Unforgettable Summer (1995)
 Eva (2010) - Doctor 
 A Good Man (2014) - Vladimir
 End of a Gun (2016) - Chauvin
 Hotel Transilvania (2012)- Dracula (Romanian version)
 The Lion King- Zazu (Romanian voice)

References 

 Claudiu Bleonţ page at National Theatre Bucharest

External links
 Official homepage
 

Romanian male film actors
1959 births
Living people
Romanian male stage actors
20th-century Romanian male actors
21st-century Romanian male actors
Male actors from Bucharest
Television people from Bucharest
Caragiale National University of Theatre and Film alumni
Recipients of the Order of Cultural Merit (Romania)